William of Hesse-Philippsthal-Barchfeld (1 April 1692 – 13 May 1761) was a member of the House of Hesse and was Landgrave of Hesse-Philippsthal-Barchfeld from 1721 to 1761.

Life 
William was a younger son of Landgrave Philip of Hesse-Philippsthal from his marriage to Catherine Amalie (1654–1736), daughter of Count Karl Otto of Solms-Laubach.

Wilhelm founded the non-sovereign line Hesse-Philippsthal-Barchfeld of the House of Hesse in 1721, after the death of his father, who had left him Barchfeld and Herleshausen in his will.  Between 1690 and 1732 he built the baroque Wilhelmsburg Castle with three wings, which was named after him, in Barchfeld.

He served in the Hessian army and later in the Dutch army.  In 1732, he was appointed governor of Ypres.  In 1733, he was promoted to lieutenant general of the cavalry.  In 1743, he led the Dutch troops in the War of the Austrian Succession.  In 1744, he had to surrender Ypres to the French.  He fought in the Battle of Fontenoy and defended Bergen op Zoom and Mons.  In 1747 he was promoted General of the Cavalry

He died in 1761, as governor of Breda.

Marriage and issue 

William married on 31 October 1724 in Hoym with Princess Charlotte Wilhelmine (1704–1766), daughter of Prince Lebrecht of Anhalt-Bernburg-Schaumburg-Hoym, with whom he had the following children:
 Charlotte (1725–1798)
 married in 1765 Count Alfred August of Ysenburg and Büdingen in Waechtersbach (1717–1782)
 William (1726–1726)
 Frederick (1727–1777), who succeeded him as Landgrave of Hesse-Philippsthal-Barchfeld
 married in 1772 Countess Sophie Henriette of Salm-Grumbach (1740–1800)
 Philip (1728–1745)
 Johanna Charlotte (1730–1799)
 Caroline (1731–1808)
 Ulrika Eleonora (1732–1795)
 married in 1755 with Landgrave William of Hesse-Philippsthal (1726–1810)
 Charles William (1734–1764)
 Anna (1735–1785)
 married in 1767 Count Adolph of Lippe-Detmold (1732–1800), son of Simon Henry Adolph of Lippe-Detmold
 George (1737–1740)
 Dorothea Marie (1738–1799)
 married in 1764 John Karl Louis, Prince of Löwenstein-Wertheim-Freudenberg (1740–1816)
 Christian (1740–1750)
 Louis Frederick (1741–1741)
 Adolph (1743–1803), Landgrave of Hesse-Philippsthal-Barchfeld
 married on 1781 to Princess Louise of Saxe-Meiningen (1752–1805)
 August (1745–1745)

Ancestry

References 

 Johann Samuel Ersch (ed.): Allgemeine Encyclopädie der Wissenschaften und Künste in alphabetischer ... p. 297 Online

Landgraves of Hesse
18th-century German people
House of Hesse
1692 births
1761 deaths